Cypress Lodge is an historic two-story frame country inn located at 18681 SW Conners Highway in Port Mayaca, Florida, United States. It was owned by Bessemer Properties and operated for many years by Paul Hoenshel, his wife Amy Hoenshel and their daughter, Mary Louise Hoenshel Smith.

On November 12, 2008, it was added to the U.S. National Register of Historic Places.

References

External links
 Vintage postcard view of Cypress Lodge

National Register of Historic Places in Martin County, Florida
Hotel buildings on the National Register of Historic Places in Florida
Buildings and structures in Martin County, Florida